Arthur Delaender (born 28 July 1890, date of death unknown) was a Belgian athlete. He competed in the men's discus throw and the men's javelin throw at the 1920 Summer Olympics.

References

External links
 

1890 births
Year of death missing
Athletes (track and field) at the 1920 Summer Olympics
Belgian male discus throwers
Belgian male javelin throwers
Olympic athletes of Belgium
Place of birth missing